The Buffalo Baseball Hall of Fame was started by the Buffalo Bisons organization in 1985 to honor former members of the Buffalo Bisons (1878, 1887–1888), Buffalo Bisons (1879–1885), Buffalo Bisons (1886–1970), Buffalo Bisons (1890), Buffalo Blues (1914–1915), Buffalo Bisons (1979–present), and other contributors to professional baseball in Western New York.

Plaques honoring all members of the Buffalo Baseball Hall of Fame are on permanent display within the Hall of Fame and Heritage Room at Sahlen Field.

Inductees

1980s

1990s

2000s

2010s

2020s

References

External links
Official website

1985 establishments in New York (state)
Awards established in 1985
Baseball museums and halls of fame
Buffalo Bisons (minor league)
Baseball
Museums in Buffalo, New York
Sports museums in New York (state)
Sports organizations established in 1985